The Biak roundleaf bat or Geelvinck Bay leaf-nosed bat (Hipposideros papua) is a species of bat in the family Hipposideridae. It is endemic to the Biak Islands (Schouten Islands) and Cenderawasih Bay (Geelvinck Bay) area of Papua Province, located in Western New Guinea, Indonesia.

Taxonomy and etymology
It was described as a new species in 1886 by British zoologist Oldfield Thomas and Italian naturalist Giacomo Doria. They initially placed it in the now-defunct genus Phyllorhina, with the scientific name Phyllorhina papua. Its species name "papua" references Papua New Guinea where Odoardo Beccari collected the holotype.

Description
It has a nose-leaf with two lateral leaflets.

It is nocturnal, roosting in sheltered places during the day such as caves.

Range and status
It is endemic to Indonesia. Its range encompasses several islands of Indonesia, including Halmahera, Bacan, Gebe, Biak, Supiori, Numfoor, and Vogelkop Peninsula of New Guinea.

As of 2008, it was evaluated as least concern by the IUCN—its lowest conservation priority.

References

Hipposideros
Bats of Indonesia
Endemic fauna of Indonesia
Mammals of Western New Guinea
Least concern biota of Asia
Least concern biota of Oceania
Mammals described in 1886
Taxonomy articles created by Polbot
Taxa named by Giacomo Doria
Taxa named by Oldfield Thomas
Bats of New Guinea